Tsai Ching-hwa is a Taiwanese politician who has been the Political Deputy Minister of Education of Taiwan since 20 May 2016.

Early life
Tsai obtained his bachelor and master's degree in education from National Kaohsiung Teachers' College in 1980 and 1983 respectively and doctoral degree in the same field from National Chengchi University in 1993.

Ministry of Education

2017 South Korea visit
On 1–8 April 2017, Tsai visited South Korea to promote educational cooperation between the two sides and to further understand the primary education system in the country. During the visit, he met with Representative to South Korea Joseph Shih in which both discussed various topics from education, tourism, economics and politics.

Non-Chinese Malaysian students in Taiwan
In July 2017, Tsai made a statement that any non-Chinese students from Malaysia would not face any difficulty to study in Taiwan as most of the courses taught at public and private higher education institutions are taught in English. He also pointed out that the ministry had instructed those institutions to cater the needs for Muslim students, especially on the availability of prayer rooms and Halal-certified foods.

References

Living people
Taiwanese Ministers of Education
Year of birth missing (living people)
National Chengchi University alumni
National Kaohsiung Normal University alumni